Lorne Taylor (born 1944) is a former tenured professor and member of the provincial legislature of Alberta, Canada.

Political career
Taylor was elected to the Legislative Assembly of Alberta in the 1993 Alberta general election. He defeated three other candidates including Al Strom of the Social Credit with a large plurality. He won his second term in office in the 1997 Alberta general election, with a larger plurality defeating three other candidates. In 1999 Taylor was appointed to the cabinet as Minister of Science and Innovation. He won his third term in office in the 2001 Alberta general election. This time Taylor won in a landslide defeating two other candidates. He was appointed to serve as Minister of the Environment and retired at dissolution of the Legislature in 2004.

References

External links
Legislative Assembly of Alberta Members Listing

1944 births
Progressive Conservative Association of Alberta MLAs
Living people
University of Calgary alumni
Members of the Executive Council of Alberta
21st-century Canadian politicians